Auburn Municipal Airport  is two miles north of downtown Auburn, in King County, Washington.

The airport is referred to as Dick Scobee Field, after Francis "Dick" Scobee, an Auburn and Washington native who was the commander astronaut for the Space Shuttle Challenger. Scobee was killed in the 1986 Challenger disaster.

The Federal Aviation Administration (FAA) National Plan of Integrated Airport Systems for 2017–2021 categorized it as a regional reliver facility.

Facilities
The airport cover  and has one asphalt runway. It has no scheduled airline service. With 318 aircraft based at Auburn, including 293 single engine, 14 multi-engine aircraft, and 11 helicopter. The airport averages 450 operations per day.

References

External links
 Auburn Municipal Airport (official site)
 City of Auburn, Washington 
 

Airports in King County, Washington
Auburn, Washington